Golden voice may refer to:

 Golden Voice Oy, a Finnish dubbing company
 The Golden Voice (album), a 1970 album by Nora Aunor
 The Golden Voice (film), a 2006 American short film about Ros Serey Sothea (see below)

People with the nickname
 Jane Cain (1909–1996), original voice of the UK speaking clock, "Girl with the Golden Voice"
 Fatu Gayflor (born 1966), Liberian singer, "the golden voice of Liberia"
 Ros Serey Sothea (c. 1948–c. 1977), Cambodian singer
 Ted Williams (voice-over artist) (born 1957), American voice-over artist and radio personality

See also 
 John Chrysostom (c. 347–407), Christian saint whose epithet means "golden mouth" (chryso+stomos)
 Articles containing "golden voice"